Rodger Head (20 June 1939 – 8 July 2012) was an Australian rules footballer who played for St Kilda in the Victorian Football League during the 1960s. Head was a member of the St Kilda 1966 Premiership team.

External links

References

1939 births
2012 deaths
St Kilda Football Club players
St Kilda Football Club Premiership players
Australian rules footballers from Victoria (Australia)
One-time VFL/AFL Premiership players